Sandor slash Ida is a 2005 Swedish tragicomedy film which was released to cinemas in Sweden on 4 February 2005, directed by Henrik Georgsson, starring Aliette Opheim and Andrej Lunusjkin. It is based on the in Sweden best selling novel Sandor slash Ida by Sara Kadefors. It is one of a few Swedish youth movies from the 2000s.

Plot
Ida lives hard and fast with too much drinking and a string of boyfriends, Sandor has very few friends and his mother insists that he practice ballet. They meet in a chat room and despite appearances they discover they have much in common. Sandor and Ida lives in different cities and when Sandor unexpectedly visits her it ends with that Sandor feels betrayed because Ida had gossiped about Sandor to her friends, which they in a drug-induced state reveals to him.

Sandor tells Ida he never wants to see her again, and returns home. After Ida's mother overdoses a few weeks later, Ida calls Sandor for consolidation and comes to visit him. Ida and Sandor again start an argument, because Ida feels mistreated by Sandors mother, and goes home again. Later she visits Sandor on his premiere ballet performance, they become reconciled, and presumably go on to live happily ever after.

References

External links

2005 films
2000s Swedish-language films
2005 romantic comedy-drama films
Swedish romantic comedy-drama films
2005 comedy films
2005 drama films
2000s Swedish films